Meliton Ademar Benítez Barbosa, known as Ademar Benítez, (born 21 May 1956) is a Uruguayan former football striker.

Career
Born in Montevideo, Ademar moved to Ecuador where he enjoyed success with Deportivo Quito during the 1975 and 1976 seasons. He joined rivals Barcelona S.C. for two seasons, but did not enjoy the same level of success.

Ademar moved to Mexico in 1979, playing in the Mexican Primera División with Club León and Pumas. He also had a brief spell in Portugal with C.S. Marítimo in 1985.

In 1986, he moved to Guatemala where he helped C.S.D. Municipal with its first league title in 11 years in 1987.
In 1988 he moved to El Salvador where he played for Club Deportivo FAS.

References

External links

1956 births
Living people
Uruguayan footballers
S.D. Quito footballers
Barcelona S.C. footballers
Club León footballers
Club Universidad Nacional footballers
C.S. Marítimo players
C.S.D. Municipal players
C.D. FAS footballers
Association football forwards